Kazim Niaz is a  Pakistani civil servant BPS-22 who served as Chief Secretary Khyber Pakhtunkhwa from October 2019 to November 2021.  He has also served as Chief Secretary Gilgit Baltistan. Niaz belongs to Rajjar area of Charsadda District.

References

Living people

Year of birth missing (living people)
Pakistani civil servants
Chief Secretaries of Khyber Pakhtunkhwa
People from Charsadda District, Pakistan